The 2017 FIRS Women's Roller Hockey World Cup was the 14th edition of the Women's Roller Hockey World Cup, organised by the Fédération Internationale de Roller Sports (FIRS). The tournament was held for the first time in China, in the city of Nanjing, from 27 August to 2 September 2017, as part of the 2017 World Roller Games.

Spain won its sixth title, retaining the title they conquered one year before.

Competition format
During the previous edition of the World Cup, the FIRS determined to end with the celebration of two different tournaments for divisions A and B, and merged all competitions in a whole event integrated in the World Roller Games. Despite this merge, teams were divided into two different competitions.

For this tournament there would not be golden goals during the overtimes.

World Championship
The eight first ranked teams were divided into two groups. All teams would qualify for the quarterfinals.

FIRS Cup
The three remaining teams would a double round-robin tournament for determining the final positions.

Teams
The 12 participating teams were divided into three competitions according to their positions in the 2016 FIRS Women's Roller Hockey World Cup. The Division B was renamed as FIRS Cup.

The two top seeded teams were drawn in different groups. The draw was held in Barcelona on 5 July 2017.

World Championship

Group A

Group B

Knockout stage

Source: FIRS

Quarterfinals

Semifinals

Third place match

Final

5th to 8th position bracket

FIRS Cup
After the withdrawal of Egypt, the competition system changed for playing each team three teams against each other.

Final standings

|-
| colspan="11"| Eliminated in the quarter-finals
|-

|-
| colspan="11"| Played the FIRS Cup
|-

|}

References

External links
World Roller Games website

Women's Roller Hockey World Cup
International roller hockey competitions hosted by China
Sport in Nanjing
FIRS World Championship
2017 in Chinese sport
August 2017 sports events in China
September 2017 sports events in China
World